Melvin J. Binford (February 8, 1903 – September 12, 1984) was an American football and basketball coach and college athletics administrator.

Coaching career

McPherson
Binford was the head football coach at McPherson College in McPherson, Kansas, serving for six seasons, from 1930 until 1935, and compiling a record of 23–26–4.

Wichita State
Binford was the 17th head football coach at the Municipal University of Wichita—now known as Wichita State University, serving for two seasons, from 1944 to 1945, and compiling a record of 11–6–1.  Binford "re-started" the program after a one-year hiatus (1943) when the school did not field a team.

Binford was more successful as Wichita's fourteenth head basketball coach. He assumed the head coaching job for the 1942–43 season, then restarted the program after it was suspended for the 1943–44 season during World War II. He coached the Shockers' basketball team for a total of five seasons, building a record of 60–50.

Head coaching record

Football

References

External links
 

1903 births
1984 deaths
American men's basketball players
McPherson Bulldogs football coaches
McPherson Bulldogs men's basketball coaches
Oklahoma City Stars athletic directors
Oklahoma City Stars men's basketball coaches
Pittsburg State Gorillas football players
Pittsburg State Gorillas men's basketball players
Wichita State Shockers football coaches
Wichita State Shockers men's basketball coaches